The 2000 Malta Grand Prix was the sixth edition of the professional ranking snooker tournament which took place at the Mediterranean Conference Centre in Valletta, Malta. Qualifying for the event started on 3 January 2000 and the final stages took place between 20 and 27 February 2000.

Ken Doherty won the tournament, defeating Mark Williams 9–3 in the final. The highest break, a 142, was compiled by quarter-finalist Ronnie O'Sullivan in his last-16 match against Jimmy White.

Prize fund
The breakdown of prize money for this year is shown below:
Winner   £50,000
Runner-up £26,000
Highest break  £3,000
Total   £290,000

Wildcard round

Main draw

Qualifying
The three qualifying rounds took place between 3 and 14 January 2000, and were all played under a best-of-nine frames format.

Round 1
 Shokat Ali 5–2  Ali Carter
 Mark Bennett 5–2  Craig Harrison
 Stuart Bingham 5–3  Lee Richardson
 Karl Broughton 5–4  Wayne Saidler
 Tony Chappel 5–3  Nick Terry
 Gareth Chilcott 5–3  Steve Judd
 Darren Clarke 5–4  Mark Davis
 Anthony Davies 5–4  Hugh Abernethy
 Mike Dunn 5–0  Mark Gray
 Nick Dyson 5–2  Craig MacGillivray
 Martin Dziewialtowski 5–2  Mark Fenton
 Leo Fernandez 5–0  Stephen Maguire
 Leigh Griffin 5–4  Munraj Pal
 Adrian Gunnell 5–3  Tony Knowles
 Kristján Helgason 5–1  Stefan Mazrocis
 Michael Holt 5–0  Patrick Delsemme
 Robin Hull 5–2  Dennis Taylor
 Michael Judge 5–0  David McLellan
 Robert Milkins 5–3  Nick Pearce
 Noppadon Noppachorn 5–3  Wayne Brown
 Stephen O'Connor 5–2  Peter McCullagh
 Dene O'Kane 5–2  Richard King
 Stuart Pettman 5–2  Mehmet Husnu
 Phaitoon Phonbun 5–4  Eddie Manning
 Barry Pinches 5–0  John Lardner
 James Reynolds 5–2  Karl Burrows
 Chris Scanlon 5–3  Ryan Day
 Mark Selby 5–2  Tony Jones
 Troy Shaw 5–3  Mario Geudens
 Paul Sweeny 5–2  Sean Storey
 Willie Thorne 5–4  Ian Brumby
 Patrick Wallace 5–2  Wayne Jones

Round 2
 Karl Broughton 5–2  Jason Ferguson
 Alfie Burden 5–2  Chris Scanlon
 Marcus Campbell 5–4  Darren Clarke
 Martin Clark 5–3  Phaitoon Phonbun
 Matthew Couch 5–2  Dene O'Kane
 Paul Davies 5–3  Kristján Helgason
 Nick Dyson 5–3  Neal Foulds
 Martin Dziewialtowski 5–3  Joe Perry
 Leo Fernandez 5–3  Gary Ponting
 Marco Fu 5–2  Mark Bennett
 David Gray 5–2  Mike Dunn
 Leigh Griffin w/o–w/d  Alain Robidoux
 Adrian Gunnell 5–3  Gerard Greene
 Euan Henderson 5–4  Tony Chappel
 Drew Henry 5–2  Willie Thorne
 Michael Holt 5–3  Dave Finbow
 Robin Hull 5–1  Jonathan Birch
 Joe Johnson 5–0  Gareth Chilcott
 Bradley Jones 5–4  Anthony Davies
 Rod Lawler 5–3  James Reynolds
 Peter Lines 5–4  Paul Sweeny
 Ian McCulloch 5–0  Shokat Ali
 Robert Milkins 5–2  David Roe
 Stuart Pettman 5–2  Steve James
 Stephen O'Connor 5–2  Nick Walker
 Barry Pinches 5–2  Dean Reynolds
 Jason Prince 5–4  Stuart Bingham
 John Read 5–2  Patrick Wallace
 Mark Selby 5–3  Jimmy Michie
 Troy Shaw 5–3  Mick Price
 Lee Walker 5–3  Michael Judge
 Paul Wykes 5–1  Noppadon Noppachorn

Round 3
 Alfie Burden 5–3  Karl Broughton
 Marcus Campbell 5–2  Euan Henderson
 Matthew Couch 5–2  Peter Lines
 Nick Dyson 5–3  John Read
 Leo Fernandez 5–2  Paul Wykes
 Marco Fu 5–1  Bradley Jones
 David Gray 5–0  Paul Davies
 Adrian Gunnell 5–0  Barry Pinches
 Drew Henry 5–1  Martin Clark
 Michael Holt w/o–w/d  Joe Johnson
 Rod Lawler 5–3  Robin Hull
 Robert Milkins 5–3  Leigh Griffin
 Stephen O'Connor 5–2  Martin Dziewialtowski
 Stuart Pettman 5–3  Ian McCulloch
 Jason Prince 5–1  Lee Walker
 Troy Shaw 5–2  Mark Selby

Round 4
 Nigel Bond 5–0  Jason Prince
 Alfie Burden 5–1  Brian Morgan
 Dominic Dale 5–2  Matthew Couch
 Nick Dyson 5–4  Dave Harold
 Marco Fu 5–2  Chris Small
 David Gray 5–1  Tony Drago
 Adrian Gunnell 5–1  Jamie Burnett
 Michael Holt 5–2  Andy Hicks
 Rod Lawler 5–0  James Wattana
 Robert Milkins 5–3  Terry Murphy
 Billy Snaddon 5–1  Marcus Campbell
 Stephen O'Connor 5–2  Darren Morgan
 Stuart Pettman 5–0  Graeme Dott
 Joe Swail 5–3  Troy Shaw
 Gary Wilkinson 5–2  Leo Fernandez
 Drew Henry w/o–w/d  Quinten Hann

Century breaks
142, 123  Ronnie O'Sullivan
138, 113  David Gray
135, 123  Peter Ebdon
135, 117, 104  Michael Holt
131, 122  Darren Morgan
129, 120  Matthew Stevens
129  Stephen O'Connor
129  Kristján Helgason
128, 107, 100  Stephen Hendry
127, 108, 101  Marco Fu
126  Joe Swail
126  Rod Lawler
123, 119, 104  Mark Williams
123, 112, 105, 105, 101  Ken Doherty
122  Karl Broughton
122  Nigel Bond
121  Robert Milkins
119, 119  Alfie Burden
117  James Reynolds
114  Steve Davis
112  John Parrott
112, 108, 107  Nick Dyson
111  Shokat Ali
105  Darren Clarke
104  Stephen Lee
103  Troy Shaw
103  Eddie Manning
102  John Higgins
100  Joe Johnson
100  Robin Hull

References

Malta Grand Prix
2000 in snooker
2000 in Maltese sport
Sport in Valletta
20th century in Valletta
Snooker ranking tournaments